Lak Ha is a neighbourhood  belonging to Ban Phaeo District of Samut Sakhon Province and Prasat Sit Sub-district, Damnoen Saduak District of Ratchaburi Province, western central Thailand.

History
Its name Lak Ha means "fifth milestone", refers to the fifth milestone of Khlong Damnoen Saduak, a khlong (canal) dug in the King Mongkut's reign (Rama IV) bridging rivers of Tha Chin to Mae Klong. It took two years, between 1866 and 1868, to complete.

Lak Ha is a Khlong Damnoen Saduak waterfront community. There are many important places, such as Buddhist temple, Wat Prasat Sith, also formerly and still colloquially known as Wat Lak Ha or Wat Don Phai, a local spiritual anchor, including the floating market, Lak Ha Floating Market which is a continuation of the Damnoen Saduak Floating Market in Damnoen Saduak District.

Luang Phor Trairat Rojanarit, a principle Buddha image of Wat Prasat Sith is worshiped by the Lak Ha people. Every year there is a local tradition, the procession of Buddha by boat along Khlong Damnoen Saduak in late January to February from the first to the eighth milestione in Damnoen Saduak District for the waterfront community people to pay homage to the good fortune.

Geography
Most of Lak Ha's area is fruit orchards and vegetable gardens, where a variety of fruits are cultivated, including grape, tangerine, dragon fruit, mango, young aromatic coconut, rose apple, etc. They are considered the main income of the community.

Khlong Damnoen Saduak that flows through the area considered as the local main watercourse. It also branched into many different tributaries, both natural and man-made waterways.

Administration
Lak Ha was established as sukhaphiban (sanitation district) in 1956 during the government of Field Marshal Plaek Phibunsongkhram. It was upgraded to a thesaban tambon (sub-district municipality) in 1999. It has an administrative area comprising four sub-districts, namely Yokkrabat, Nong Bua, Nong Song Hong, and Rong Khe, 41 mubans (village), with a total area of 125.57 km2.

Lak Ha Sub-district Municipality hemmed by other areas (from the north clockwise): Bang Phae in Ratchaburi Province, and Sam Phran in Nakhon Pathom Province, Ban Phaeo and Mueang Samut Sakhon in Samut Sakhon Province, with Damnoen Saduak in Ratchaburi Province and Mueang Samut Songkhram in Samut Songkhram Province, respectively.

The emblem of sub-district municipality shows rowing boat of female greengrocer in Khlong Damnoen Saduak and the backdrop is Wat Lak Si Rat Samoson, that refers to ancient temple which is the foundation of culture, fruit and vegetable selling cruise means the abundance of crops and nature, while Khlong Damnoen Saduak represents the prosperity of water transportation that has been around for a long time.

The sub-district municipality slogan is "The prosperous agricultural town, the territory of four sub-districts, strong communities join forces to develop".

Population
In December 2013, it had total population of 40,157 people (19,574 men, and 20,583 women) in 9,044 households.

Places of interest
Wat Prasat Sith
Wat Lak Si Rat Samoson
Lak Ha Floating Market

References

Neighbourhoods in Thailand
Populated places in Ratchaburi province
Populated places in Samut Sakhon province